Eisvögel USC Freiburg is a German women's professional basketball team based in Freiburg im Breisgau. 

As of 2022, the team is the reigning champion of the 1. Damen-Basketball-Bundesliga, the highest level of basketball in Germany. 

The team brought the first national championship to the city of Freiburg im Breisgau in 115 years.

Notable players

  Emilly Kapitza 
  Lina Sontag
  Hannah Little

See also
 USC Freiburg

References

External links
German League profile
Eurobasket.com profile

Basketball teams established in 1972
Sport in Freiburg im Breisgau
Women's basketball teams in Germany